"Koisuru Velfarre Dance ~Saturday night~" is MAX's debut single released under Avex Trax.  It is a Japanese language cover of the song "Saturday Night" released in 1994 by Whigfield. As the song was originally recorded for the opening of Avex's Velfarre club, it was meant to be MAX's only release as the group was created solely for promoting the club. However, following the official demise of their original group Super Monkey's, the group released another single "Kiss Me Kiss Me, Baby" beginning their reign as one of Japan's most successful and enduring girl groups.

Overview 
MAX's version of "Saturday Night" although a cover, is not a direct translation of the original Whigfield version. Besides new lyrics, MAX's version contains an entirely new comedic spoken word verse. The "Nite Mix" version that appears as a b-side on the single is closer to the original Whigfield version, although it is sped up. A music video for the song was filmed in the Velfarre night club and features MAX and club-goers performing the same dance routine popularized by Whigfield.

Track list

Charts 
Oricon Sales Chart (Japan)

References 

1995 songs
1995 debut singles
MAX (band) songs
Songs with lyrics by Yasushi Akimoto
Songs written by Larry Pignagnoli